The following is a timeline of the history of the municipality of Bayamón, Puerto Rico.

19th century

 1772
 Santa Cruz Church construction begins.
 José Ramírez de Arellano becomes mayor.
 1883 - Population: 15,752 in ayuntamiento (city); 125,277 in departamento (province).

20th century

 1900 - First automobile is photographed in Bayamón
 1905 - Mahogany tree planted in the plaza.
 1908 - Plata Bridge built.
 1910 - Farmacia Serra (pharmacy) building constructed.
 1928 - Hurricane.
 1932 - Hurricane.
 1949 - Puerto Rico National Cemetery established.
 1964
 Universidad Católica de Bayamón established.
 Santa Rosa Mall in business.
 1970 - Population: 147,552.
 1974
 Vaqueros de Bayamón baseball club formed.
 Juan Ramón Loubriel Stadium opens.
 1977 - City flag design adopted.
 1980 - Bayamón City Hall built.
 1982 - Plaza Rio Hondo shopping mall in business.
 1984 - Braulio Castillo Theater opens.
 1988 - Coliseo Rubén Rodríguez (arena) opens.
 1990 - Botanical garden established.
 1997 - Carmen Delia Dipiní Theater opens.
 1998 - Plaza del Sol shopping mall in business.
 1999 - Puerto Rico Bayamón football club formed.
 2000
 Public Library building constructed.
 Population: 203,499.

21st century
 2001

 May 11: Miss Universe 2001 beauty pageant held in Bayamón
 Ramón Luis Rivera Jr. becomes mayor
 2004 - Tren Urbano (regional transit) begins operating
 2010 - Population: 208,116
 2009 - an explosion and fire at the Cataño oil refinery
 2011 - Bayamón Soccer Complex opens
 2015 - Puerto Rico FC (football club) formed

See also

 List of mayors of Bayamón, Puerto Rico
 National Register of Historic Places listings in Bayamón
 Timeline of Mayagüez, Puerto Rico, Ponce, San Juan

References

Bibliography

in English

in Spanish
  (reprint 1998)
  1979-1982 (8 vols.)
  (2 vols.)

External links

 
  (Includes bibliographic information on Bayamón history)
 Items related to Bayamón, Puerto Rico, various dates (via University of Puerto Rico's Biblioteca Digital Puertorriqueña)
 Items related to Bayamón, Puerto Rico, various dates (via Digital Public Library of America)
 Digitized materials related to Bayamón in the Archivo Histórico Nacional of Spain, records of the Ministerio de Ultramar; via Portal de Archivos Españoles

History of Puerto Rico
Bayamon
Years in Puerto Rico
Bayamón, Puerto Rico